Oleo is an album by American jazz guitarist Grant Green featuring performances recorded in 1962 and released on the Blue Note label in Japan in 1980. It features Green with pianist Sonny Clark, bassist Sam Jones and drummer Louis Hayes. The tracks were later re-issued in 1997 as part of The Complete Quartets with Sonny Clark.

Reception

The Allmusic review by Michael Erlewine awarded the album 4½ stars and stated "another excellent album with Green and pianist Sonny Clark".

Track listing
 "Oleo" (Sonny Rollins) – 5:37
 "Little Girl Blue" (Lorenz Hart, Richard Rodgers) – 7:15
 "Tune-Up" (Eddie Vinson) – 7:19
 "Hip Funk" (Grant Green) – 8:39
 "My Favorite Things" (Oscar Hammerstein II, Richard Rodgers) – 8:32

Personnel
Grant Green - guitar
Sonny Clark - piano
Sam Jones - bass
Louis Hayes - drums

References 

Grant Green albums
1980 albums
Blue Note Records albums
Albums produced by Alfred Lion
Albums recorded at Van Gelder Studio